The Cremorne was a pornographic magazine published by William Lazenby in London in 1882 (but falsely backdated to 1851).  The title alludes to Cremorne Gardens which had by that time become a haunt of prostitutes.  The magazine was a sequel to The Pearl.

The story "The Secret Life of Linda Brent" is an obscene parody of "Incidents in the Life of a Slave Girl", by Harriet Jacobs writing under the pseudonym of Linda Brent.  It is in the same vein as "My Grandmother's Tale", previously published in The Pearl.

References

 Paul Giles, "Atlantic republic: the American tradition in English literature", Oxford University Press, 2006, p.149
 Michael Matthew Kaylor, "Secreted Desires: The Major Uranians: Hopkins, Pater and Wilde", Michael Matthew Kaylor, 2006, p.15
 Lisa Z. Sigel, "International exposure: perspectives on modern European pornography, 1800-2000", Rutgers University Press, 2005, p.64,73-74

Erotica magazines published in the United Kingdom
Defunct magazines published in the United Kingdom
Magazines established in 1882
Magazines with year of disestablishment missing
Magazines published in London